"FF / VinterNoll2" is a single CD by the Swedish band Kent released in 2002. It was released as the third single from their fifth album Vapen & Ammunition.

The single actually comes with two CDs. The CD is a double A-side in gatefold cardboard picture sleeve. There are technically two covers of the album, and they are connected. The only difference being that one says FF and the other one says VinterNoll2. "VinterNoll2" is also featured in the videogame Guitar Hero: World Tour.

The French singer Nancy Danino performs on the song "FF".

Track listing

Charts

Weekly charts

Year-end charts

Certifications
While charting in Sweden, "FF / VinterNoll2" was certified gold in 2002.

References

2002 singles
Kent (band) songs
2002 songs